28th Army may refer to:

28th Army (People's Republic of China)
28th Army (Soviet Union)